PS-111 Karachi South-V is a constituency of the Provincial Assembly of Sindh.

By elections 2018

The seat became vacant after Imran Ismail resigned for Governor Sindh's post. By elections were held in the whole constituency on 21 October 2018 and Pakistan Tehreek-e-Insaf's Shahzad Qureshi won the seat in by-polls.

General elections 2018

General elections are scheduled to be held on 25 July 2018.

General elections 2013

General elections 2008

See also
 PS-110 Karachi South-IV
 PS-112 Keamari-I

References

External links
 Election commission Pakistan's official website
 Awazoday.com check result
 Official Website of Government of Sindh

Constituencies of Sindh